Édith Ker, born Édith Denise Keraudren (1910–1997) was a French actress born in Brest (Finistère). She is best known to English-speaking audiences as the grandmother in Jean-Pierre Jeunet's Delicatessen.

Filmography
1957: Fernand clochard (de Pierre Chevalier)
1962: Les Bricoleurs (de Jean Girault)
1962: Le Gentleman d'Epsom (de Gilles Grangier)
1964: La Fleur de l'âge (de John Guillermin)
1964: Le Vampire de Düsseldorf (de Robert Hossein)
1965: Fantômas se déchaîne (d'André Hunebelle)
1965: Tant qu'on a la santé (de Pierre Étaix)
1967: La mariée était en noir (de François Truffaut)
1968: La Grande Lessive (!) (de Jean-Pierre Mocky) - La bonne des Lavalette
1969: La Peau de Torpedo (de Jean Delannoy)
1971: L'Italien des roses (de Charles Matton)
1972: Elle cause plus... elle flingue (de Michel Audiard)
1974: Les Filles de Malemort (de Daniel Daërt)
1974: Le Futur aux trousses (de Dolorès Grassian)
1974: Y'a un os dans la moulinette (de Raoul André)
1975: Divine (de Dominique Delouche)
1979: Tous vedettes (de Michel Lang)
1990: Delicatessen (de Jean-Pierre Jeunet et Marc Caro) - Grandmother (final film role)

External links

1910 births
1997 deaths
French film actresses
French television actresses
Actors from Brest, France
20th-century French actresses